Muhoberac is a surname. Notable people with the surname include:

Jamie Muhoberac, American musician
Larry Muhoberac (1937–2016), American musician, record producer, and composer, father of Jamie and Parrish

Croatian surnames